Shashank Trivedi is an Indian politician and a member of 18th Legislative Assembly, Uttar Pradesh of India. He represents the ‘Maholi’ constituency in Sitapur district of Uttar Pradesh.

Political career
Shashank Trivedi contested Uttar Pradesh Assembly Elections 2017 for the first time, as the Bharatiya Janata Party candidate for Maholi (Assembly constituency) constituency. He defeated incumbent Anoop Kumar Gupta of the Samajwadi Party in a close contest with a margin of 3,717 votes. This was a major win for Bharatiya Janata Party in Sitapur district, since the incumbent and his father (earlier independent candidate and then Samajwadi Party) had represented the area for more than two decades. Shashank Trivedi again was elected for same constituency for 18th UP Assembly in March 2022.

Shashank Trivedi is also member of ethics committee in UP legislative assembly for 2017–2018.

Posts held

References

Year of birth missing (living people)
Living people
Bharatiya Janata Party politicians from Uttar Pradesh
Uttar Pradesh MLAs 2017–2022
Uttar Pradesh MLAs 2022–2027